Stefan Lazarević (born 20 August 1996) is a Serbian professional basketball player for Crvena zvezda of the Basketball League of Serbia, the Adriatic League and the EuroLeague.

Playing career 
Lazarević grew up with the Crvena zvezda youth system. He won the 2014 Euroleague NIJT. On March 8, 2014, Lazarević made his professional debut for Crvena zvezda in the ABA League win over Krka, making 1 steal in under 2 minutes of playing time. On August 29, 2014, Lazarević signed a four-year contract for Crvena zvezda. He was loaned out to FMP for the 2014–15 season. Also, he was loaned out to FMP in the next two seasons.

On September 13, 2017, Lazarević signed his second four-year contract for the Zvezda. On October 13, 2017, he made his EuroLeague debut against Žalgiris, making his only two-point attempt in under 5 minutes of playing time. In December 2017, he was loaned out to FMP for the rest of the 2017–18 season. On February 17, 2018, Lazarević injured left knee during the Radivoj Korać Cup Semifinal game. He was later ruled out for the rest of the season. Lazarević was ruled out for the entire 2018–19 season, even he was added to the 2019 FMP Serbian SuperLeague roster.

On December 20, 2019, Lazarević recorded an assist for 3 minutes played in a 84–81 win over Krka. It was the first official game since his injury on February 17, 2018.

In July 2021, Lazarević ended his term with FMP and returns to Crvena zvezda.

National team career 
Lazarević was a member of the Serbian under-16 team that won the bronze medal at the 2012 FIBA Europe Under-16 Championship in Latvia and Lithuania. Over nine tournament games, he averaged 6.1 points, 10.4 rebounds and 1.0 assists per game. He was a member of the Serbian under-18 team that won the silver medal at the 2014 FIBA Europe Under-18 Championship in Konya, Turkey. Over nine tournament games, he averaged 13.1 points, 7.9 rebounds and 1.3 assists per game. He was named to the All-Tournament Team. Lazarević was a member of the Serbian under-19 team that played at the 2015 FIBA Under-19 World Championship in Heraklion, Greece . Over four tournament games, he averaged 4.5 points, 4.0 rebounds and 0.5 assists per game. He was a member of the Serbian under-20 team that played at the 2016 FIBA Europe Under-20 Championship in Helsinki, Finland. Over seven tournament games, he averaged 10.9 points, 8.1 rebounds and 2.1 assists per game.

References

External links
 Profile at eurobasket.com
 Profile at euroleague.net
 Profile at FIBA

1996 births
Living people
ABA League players
Basketball players from Belgrade
Basketball League of Serbia players
KK Crvena zvezda players
KK FMP players
Serbian men's basketball players
Shooting guards
Small forwards